Drew Morey (born 27 November 1996) is an Australian cyclist, who currently rides for UCI Continental team .

Major results
2017
 1st Stage 1 Tour de Flores
 2nd Overall Tour of Quanzhou Bay
 4th Overall Tour of Fuzhou
 7th Overall Tour de Ijen
 10th Road race, Oceania Road Championships
 10th Overall Tour de Hokkaido
2019
 1st Oita Urban Classic
 5th Overall Tour of Japan
2022
 5th Road race, National Road Championships
2023
 4th Road race, National Road Championships
 4th Overall Tour of Sharjah
 5th Overall New Zealand Cycle Classic

References

External links

1996 births
Living people
Australian male cyclists